Metazym is an experimental recombinant enzyme that was studied in patients with late infantile metachromatic leukodystrophy, but found to be ineffective under the conditions of that trial. A subsequent clinical trial is ongoing. The drug became a source of controversy when a family attempted to purchase the drug for their child before it was approved.

References

Biopharmaceuticals